Rover's Big Chance is a 1942 Our Gang short comedy film directed by Herbert Glazer. It was the 208th Our Gang short (209th episode, 120th talking short, 121st talking episode, and 40th MGM produced episode) that was released.

Plot
On the say-so of studio casting director J.D. Broderick, Patterson agrees to give a screen test to the Our Gang kids' talented dog Rover. Unfortunately, he petulant pooch does not take direction well, nor does he respond positively when the cameraman announces that he is ready to start filming.

Production notes
By the time of Rover's Big Chance, Mickey Gubitosi had legally changed his name to Robert "Bobby" Blake. He retained the name "Mickey" for the remainder of the series.

Rover's Big Chance was the second MGM Our Gang short to lose money upon its initial release, losing nearly $1,800 after post-production costs were calculated.

Future film star Stephen McNally appears in this Our Gang episode as Bill Patterson, ace director at Mammoth Studios.

Cast

The Gang
 Bobby Blake as Mickey
 Janet Burston as Janet
 Billy Laughlin as Froggy
 George McFarland as Spanky
 Billie Thomas as Buckwheat

Additional cast
 Horace Stephen McNally as Wm. "Bill" Patterson
 Freddie Chapman as Tony
 Clyde Demback as Fatty
 Bobby Anderson as Baseball player
 Billy Finnegan as Baseball player
 Bert Le Baron as Grip
 Barbara Bedford as Studio clerk
 Ben Hall as George 
 Hugh McCormick as Professor Ventriloko
 Byron Shores as J.D. Broderick

See also
 Our Gang filmography

References

External links

1942 films
1942 comedy films
American black-and-white films
Films directed by Herbert Glazer
Metro-Goldwyn-Mayer short films
Our Gang films
1942 short films
1940s American films
1940s English-language films